Corporal Thomas Cullen (February 26, 1839 – August 17, 1913) was an Irish soldier who fought in the American Civil War. Cullen received the United States' highest award for bravery during combat, the Medal of Honor, for his action at Bristoe Station in Virginia on October 14, 1863. He was honored with the award on December 1, 1864.

Biography
Cullen was born in Ireland on February 26, 1839. He joined the 82nd New York Volunteer Infantry Regiment in May 1861. He was wounded in the Battle of Gettysburg, and captured in the Battle of Jerusalem Plank Road. After his parole in July 1864, he was transferred to the 59th New York Volunteer Infantry Regiment, and mustered out in June 1865. Cullen died in Coudersport, Pennsylvania on August 17, 1913 and his remains are interred at the Saint Mary's Cemetery in Pennsylvania.

See also

List of American Civil War Medal of Honor recipients: A–F

References

External links
 

1839 births
1913 deaths
People of New York (state) in the American Civil War
Union Army officers
United States Army Medal of Honor recipients
American Civil War recipients of the Medal of Honor
Irish-born Medal of Honor recipients